Bruce Starr (born January 12, 1969) is an American politician and businessman in Oregon. A Republican, he served two terms in the Oregon House of Representatives before winning election to the Oregon State Senate in 2002. There he joined his father Senator Charles Starr and they became the first father-son team to serve at the same time in Oregon's Senate. Bruce had previously been a member of the Hillsboro City Council, and was re-elected to the Senate in 2006 and 2010, but lost a bid in 2012 to be the Oregon Labor Commissioner.

Early life
Starr is from Aloha, Oregon, and was born in 1969 in Portland, Oregon, as the youngest of four children to Charles and Kathy Starr. Starr grew up to the south of Hillsboro where he attended Groner Elementary before graduating from Hillsboro High School in 1986. That year he completed high school in independent study in order to work for the campaign of Joe Lutz who was running against Bob Packwood. Lutz lost in the  Republican primary for Packwood's United States Senate seat. After high school he attended Portland State University (PSU) and worked as a legislative intern for Oregon Senator Bob Kintigh during the 1987 and 1989 legislatures. In 1988, he was a delegate to the Republican National Convention held in New Orleans, Louisiana.

Starr graduated from PSU with a Bachelor of Science degree in political science in 1991. After college he worked as a contractor for his own roofing and residential construction company. He married Rebecca, and they have one daughter and one son, living in Hillsboro on Portland's west side. He worked as a manager for the Portland Business Alliance for international trade and business development before becoming a business owner once again with Cutting Edge Communications.

Political career
In 1992, Starr was selected to serve on the Republican Party's Washington County Central Committee for a two-year term. He served as a committee person at his local Republican precinct and as a legislative aide to his father before election to the Hillsboro City Council in 1994. Starr ran against Donald W. Surhbier for a four-year term representing Ward 1. He was appointed to budget committees of both the county and Hillsboro during this time. He remained on the city council until running for the Oregon House of Representatives in 1998 to replace his father, who was running for the state senate. The district had more registered Republican voters than Democrats. Bruce also served as his father's legislative aide during the elder's terms in the Oregon House.

He won re-election to the House in 2000, winning 57% of the vote and defeating Libertarian David Hintz who received 3% and Democrat Cathy Lamb-Mullin with 40%. Starr was unopposed in the May primary. During the 2001 legislature Starr served as chair of the House's committee on transportation. He also proposed naming the state's new building on the Capitol Mall be named after former U.S. President Ronald Reagan.

In 2002, Starr ran for the state senate to represent District 15, which had been redrawn after the 2000 Census. The new version of the district was entirely within Washington County and included Forest Grove, Cornelius, and Hillsboro. Part of the reason for moving to the state senate was that term limits at the time limited people to 12 years maximum and three terms in the House, and Starr hoped to serve for the maximum amount of time. He was elected in the November election to a four-year term, and became part of the first father-son tandem in the history of the Oregon Senate. Bruce received 60% of the vote compared to Democrat Ermine Todd who received 34% and Constitutional Party candidate Tom Humphrey who garnered 3%. This was also the first time since 1977 that a child served alongside their parent in either chamber.

Working in the legislature he helped create and pass the Oregon Transportation Investment Act and sponsored Oregon's version of Jessica's Law. Starr won re-election to the Senate in November 2006, defeating Democrat John Napolitano with 54% to 46% of the vote after running unopposed in the May primary. He represents District 15 which is composed mainly of Washington County and includes part of Clackamas County.

In February 2007, he was fined by the state's ethics commission a total of $300 for failing to report two trips paid for by lobbyists as required by law. One trip was to Israel, while the other was a trip to Hawaii paid for by Oregon Beer & Wine Distributors Association in which four other state legislators were also fined. Starr sponsored a bill that required the Oregon Department of Motor Vehicles to issue driver's licenses only to legal residents in May 2007. The bill passed the Senate, but was not enacted into law. A similar measure was passed in February 2008 and signed into law the Oregon Governor Ted Kulongoski. Starr was fined again in late 2007, this time for $20,000 for failing to file campaign finance reports on time. In November 2007, Starr opted not to run for the open Oregon Secretary of State position in 2008; he was the most mentioned Republican option to run against several Democratic candidates. He had considered running for the office in 2004. Starr did enter the race to serve as Commissioner of the Oregon Bureau of Labor and Industries in December 2011 for the May 2012 primary. He was unopposed, but lost in the general election in November 2012 to incumbent Brad Avakian 47% to 53%.

Starr faced a rematch against 2010 opponent Chuck Riley in the closest Oregon legislative race of 2014, which Riley narrowly won. The race was not called for nearly a week after Election Day.

See also
Larry George

References

External links
Willamette Week
Oregon Senate
Project Vote Smart
Follow The Money 2006

1969 births
Hillsboro City Council members (Oregon)
Hillsboro High School (Oregon) alumni
Living people
Republican Party members of the Oregon House of Representatives
Republican Party Oregon state senators
Portland State University alumni
21st-century American politicians
People from Aloha, Oregon